Ivan Ivanovich Melnikov (born 7 August 1950) is a Russian politician. He is the Vice-Chairman of the Communist Party of the Russian Federation (CPRF), and First Vice-Chairman of the State Duma. He is also a professor at Moscow State University.

Melnikov was sanctioned by the United States Department of the Treasury following the 2022 Russian invasion of Ukraine.

References

External links
Ivan Melnikov on the CPRF's website

1950 births
21st-century Russian politicians
Communist Party of the Russian Federation members
Living people
Moscow State University alumni
Russian communists
Russian mathematicians
Secretariat of the Central Committee of the Communist Party of the Soviet Union members
Second convocation members of the State Duma (Russian Federation)
Third convocation members of the State Duma (Russian Federation)
Fourth convocation members of the State Duma (Russian Federation)
Fifth convocation members of the State Duma (Russian Federation)
Sixth convocation members of the State Duma (Russian Federation)
Seventh convocation members of the State Duma (Russian Federation)
Eighth convocation members of the State Duma (Russian Federation)